Enekbatus planifolius is a shrub endemic to Western Australia.

It blooms between September and October producing pink flowers.

It is found on gentle slopes in the Mid West region of Western Australia around Morawa where it grows in sandy-silty soils.

References

planifolius
Endemic flora of Western Australia
Myrtales of Australia
Rosids of Western Australia
Endangered flora of Australia
Plants described in 2010
Taxa named by Malcolm Eric Trudgen
Taxa named by Barbara Lynette Rye